Ángel Liberal Lucini (died. October 2, 2006) was the soldier and admiral in Spanish Military to become the first Chief of the Defense Staff (JEMAD) during it creation, a office he holds from January 1984 to October 1986.

Ángel Liberal Lucini, a admiral general and military man was born 19 September 1921 in Barcelona, Catalonia. His father served as an infantry commander and vice to the captain general of Valladolid in 1936, fought during the civil war and was the first victim of Spanish civil war. Ángel Liberal, at his early age, his father usually takes him along in the port at Barcelona to see the ships anchored from which in a 'on occasion' comments interest of becoming a sailor.

He enrolled in the Naval Academy Cádiz in 1938 at the age of 16-17 and graduated in 1942. He graduated very young and at the age of  23 commands his first ships Torpedo boat LT 25 in 1945, Arcila 1949 and the Alcalá Galiano in 1962. Angel Liberal has never participate in the civil war during his services in the Navy, he was onetime, in commands of 17 ships in the Bodyguard Command, a reports says he has never arrest anyone during his commands that was in 1976 as rear admiral.

He earned a diploma in Naval warfare at Naval War College of which he also did served as the college deputy director, head of studies and instruction of the Military Naval School in 1961, he was naval attaché at the Embassy of Spain in United States.

Post-military 
He held various political Military post during his service, he was first Secretary General of the Navy during the creation of Ministry of Defense in 1977 that was during 23-F attempted coup which he dismantled, Secretary General for Defense Economic Affairs and was the Undersecretary of Defense was in February 23, 1981 and during that year Spanish Military enter the Atlantic Alliance. He served in the cabinet of Admiral Nieto Antúnez as a chief cabinet for four years, he was also among the collaborators that sees the creation of the Department of Defense came to exist and was a member of the Council of State in 1996.

Ángel Liberal took part in Spanish-North American negotiations for the Friendship and Cooperation Agreement.

Ranks and commands 
He became rear admiral in 1974 served as the head bidy and vice admiral in 1977 from which he rose to the rank of admiral 1982 and became the captain general of the Mediterranean maritime zone in January 1983 until January 1984 when was appointed as the first Chief of the Defense Staff (JEMAD). He works closely with Lieutenant General Gutiérrez Mellado during this time Spain joined the NATO. He did represents the Spanish Military in NATO Military Committee and served as the president of the organization for one year was between 1984 – 1985 of which he collaborate on the Gibraltar dispute which was prepared by the Institute for International Issues and Foreign Policy, that was in the discussion forum in 1997.

He moved on to the reserve force after completing his tenure as the Chief of the Defense Staff (JEMAD) was in October 1986, Lieutenant General Gonzalo Puigcerver of the air force took over from him as (CHODS) but got an honorary promotion to admiral general in 1999.

Family members 
His father Angel Liberal Travieso born March 27, 1891 in San Juan de, Puerto Rico to Ángel Liberal Rodríguez and Providencia Travieso, he was the aide-de-camp in 1931 to Captain General of Valladolid General Nicolás Molero Lobo and his assistant in 1936, during the civil war, his father died trying to oppose a rebellious troops who are trying to assault the Captaincy building in Villacastín. His father was fatally wounded, he was the first to be killed, the bullet shot by commander Riobóo in the Castilian city during the civil war. His mother was Ana María Fernández Núñez-Mota, he has three siblings María Gloria, Eduardo who is a lieutenant in the Navy commanded the destroyer Marqués de la Ensenada, and María Concepción. His mother Ana María was the daughter of Admiral and captain general of the Cantabrian Pedro Fernández Martín and three of her brothers are served in the Navy.

Death 
Ángel Liberal Lucini died on October 2, 2006 after at Ruber Clinic in Madrid, he was at age 85.

Decorations

Notes

References

External links 

 

1921 births
Chiefs of the Defence Staff (Spain)
2006 deaths
Spanish admirals
Spanish naval officers